Douglas Reid (23 September 1886 – 21 August 1959) was an Australian cricketer. He played three first-class matches for New South Wales between 1908/09 and 1909/10.

See also
 List of New South Wales representative cricketers

References

External links
 

1886 births
1959 deaths
Australian cricketers
New South Wales cricketers
Cricketers from Sydney